Joya (birth name Joya Owens; born March 12, 1970) in Detroit, Michigan, United States is an American singer-songwriter, who released her debut album Here I Am on Atlas/A&M record label. Following her debut album release, Joya was a background session vocalist for various artists' including R&B/soul singer Mary J. Blige. She also toured as a background singer during Blige's Share My World Tour in 1998.

Career
In 1995, Joya released her first single "I Like What You're Doing to Me" off her debut album Here I Am released on A&M Records on June 20, 1995. The song is described as having an R&B feel with a touch of Hip hop. Her second single "Gettin' off on You", was released and hit number 67 on the Billboard Hot R&B/Hip-Hop Singles & Tracks chart.<ref>

Discography

Albums
1995: Here I Am
2001: Pages from the Book of Life
2016: Accolades

EPs
2012: Jewel

Singles
1995 - "I Like What You're Doing to Me"
1995 - "Gettin' Off On You"
1995 - "Love You All Ova"
2001 - When I Drop The News
2012 - Black Pill
2015 - Match
2016 - Online

References

External links
Joya Owens Bio|Facebook.com
[ Billboard.com] Artist bio, discography.

1978 births
Living people
African-American women singer-songwriters
American women pop singers
American contemporary R&B singers
American rhythm and blues singer-songwriters
American soul musicians
Singers from Detroit
21st-century African-American women singers
Singer-songwriters from Michigan
20th-century African-American women singers